Marwan Ragab (born 3 August 1974) is an Egyptian handball coach for the Egyptian national team.

He competed for the Egypt men's national handball team at the 2000 and 2004 Summer Olympics.

References

External links 
 

1974 births
Living people
Place of birth missing (living people)
Handball coaches
Egyptian male handball players
Olympic handball players of Egypt
Handball players at the 2000 Summer Olympics
Handball players at the 2004 Summer Olympics